S28 may refer to:

Aviation 
 Blériot-SPAD S.28, a French long-distance biplane
 International Peace Garden Airport in Rolette County, North Dakota
 Letov Š-28, a Czechoslovak reconnaissance biplane
 Sikorsky S-28, a proposed French biplane bomber

Roads 
 County Route S28 (California)
 New Jersey Route 18, partially designated S28 until 1953
 Northern Airport Expressway, China

Science 
 40S ribosomal protein S28
 British NVC community S28, a swamps and tall-herb fens community in the British National Vegetation Classification system
 S28: After contact with skin, wash immediately with plenty of ... (to be specified by the manufacturer), a safety phrase
 Sulfur-28, an isotope of sulfur

Other uses 
 S28 (Rhine-Ruhr S-Bahn)
 , a submarine of the Royal Navy
 Mena Station, in Rankoshi, Isoya District, Hokkaido, Japan
 SREC (file format), an ASCII encoding format for binary data
 , a submarine of the United States Navy